The UK R&B Chart is a weekly chart that ranks the biggest-selling singles that are classified in the R&B genre in the United Kingdom. The chart is compiled by the Official Charts Company, and is based on both physical and digital single sales.

Summary
2011 opened with international artist Rihanna's collaboration with Young Money-member Drake, "What's My Name?" continuing its reign at the peak. Having first reached the peak on 19 December 2010 the single has spent a total of five consecutive weeks at number-one (two in 2010, the other three in 2011).

Rihanna's reign at the peak of the chart was ended when Sean Combs' latest group Diddy-Dirty Money debuted at number-one on 23 January 2011 with "Coming Home", which also featured singer-songwriter Skylar Grey.  Having spent an equal number of weeks at the peak, three; the single was knocked from the peak on 13 February by British rapper Chipmunk and his collaboration with American R&B artist Chris Brown, "Champion". The single spent two weeks at the peak of the chart before being toppled by Rihanna, who claimed her second R&B number-one of 2011 with "S&M" on 27 February. After five consecutive weeks at number-one, "S&M" was knocked down to number two in favour of Jennifer Lopez and her comeback collaboration with Pitbull, "On the Floor".

After three consecutive weeks at the peak, "On the Floor" was dethroned by Wretch 32 on 24 April, with second single "Unorthodox"; a collaboration with rapper Example. The following week saw Bruno Mars climb to the top spot with third single "The Lazy Song". The appearance marked the singer's third R&B number-one single, following collaborations with B.o.B and Travie McCoy – "Nothin' On You" (2010) and "Billionaire" (2010). On its third week at the peak, the single also topped the UK Singles Chart – the fourth number-one for Mars.

Having spent five weeks at the peak, Bruno Mars was toppled from the number-one spot on 4 June by American singer Aloe Blacc with breakthrough single "I Need a Dollar". The single spent two consecutive weeks at the summit before the Tinchy Stryder and Dappy (of N-Dubz) collaboration "Spaceship" debuted at number-one on 19 June. The following week Jason Derülo claimed the number-one single, when "Don't Wanna Go Home" debuted on the chart. The single also topped the UK chart and marked Derülo's fourth number-one single on the chart – the others being "Whatcha Say" (2009), "In My Head" (2010) and "Ridin' Solo" (2010).

Spending only two weeks at the peak, Derülo was shortly replaced by Loick Essien with the breakthrough single "How We Roll", which featured guest vocals from Tanya Lacey. The following week saw R&B-legend Beyoncé claim another number-one single with "Best Thing I Never Had". The single marks the third R&B number-one single for the singer, the others being "If I Were a Boy" (2008) and "Single Ladies (Put a Ring on It)" (2009). Following two weeks at the number-one spot, Beyoncé was replaced by British boyband JLS with the Dev-assisted single "She Makes Me Wanna". The single, which also debuted at number-one on the singles chart, marks the fourth R&B number-one single for the group; with the remaining singles being: "Beat Again" (2009), "Everybody in Love" (2009) and "The Club Is Alive" (2010).

Following the three-week reign of JLS, Wretch 32 claimed a second R&B number-one single on 21 August with Josh Kumra-assisted single "Don't Go". The single, which also topped the singles chart spent two weeks at the peak before singer/songwriter Ed Sheeran claimed a first number-one single with "You Need Me, I Don't Need You". 18 September saw Sean Kingston claim his first number-one single on the year. "Party All Night (Sleep All Day)" rose to success following prominent usage in the 2011 comedy The Inbetweeners Movie which topped the Box Office. After two weeks at the summit, Kingston was dethroned by N-Dubz member-gone solo Dappy with the debut single "No Regrets". The single, which also topped the singles chart, spent three weeks at the summit; bringing Dappy's total to four weeks at the peak in 2011 alone.

On 16 October, Gym Class Heroes debuted at number-one with the Adam Levine (of Maroon 5) assisted "Stereo Hearts". The single, which spent two weeks at the summit, also reached number-three on the singles chart. The track was pushed down to number-two on 30 October when British rapper Professor Green claimed both his first number-one single and first R&B number-one single. The single "Read All About It", which featured vocals from Emeli Sandé, sold more than 153,000 copies and appears on the album, At Your Inconvenience (2011). JLS then claimed a fifth R&B number-one single in November 2011 with "Take a Chance on Me", preventing Green from achieving a third consecutive week at the summit.

20 November saw rapper Flo Rida debut at number-one with the Etta James-sampled "Good Feeling". The track, which reached number two in the singles chart, spent three consecutive weeks at the summit; marking his second number-one single after "Right Round" featuring Ke$ha (2009). The final number-one single of the year came from Lloyd and André 3000's collaborative single "Dedication to My Ex (Miss That)", also credited to narrator Lil Wayne. The single topped the charts on 11 December, also peaking at number three on the singles chart.

Number-one singles

Notes
  – The album was simultaneously number-one on the UK Singles Chart. 
  – The artist was simultaneously number-one on the R&B albums chart.

Number-one artists

See also

List of UK Singles Chart number ones of the 2010s
List of UK Dance Singles Chart number ones of 2011
List of UK Independent Singles Chart number ones of 2011
List of UK Singles Downloads Chart number ones of the 2000s
List of UK Rock & Metal Singles Chart number ones of 2011
List of UK R&B Albums Chart number ones of 2011

References

External links
R&B Singles Top 40 at the Official Charts Company
UK Top 40 RnB Singles at BBC Radio 1

United Kingdom RandB Singles
2011
Number-one RandB singles